The 1986 United States Senate election in Georgia was held on November 8, 1986. Incumbent Republican U.S. Senator Mack Mattingly ran for re-election, but was defeated by Democrat Wyche Fowler in a close race. This was the last time until 2021 where Democrats won the class 3 senate seat on partisan lines. This was also the last time a Democrat was elected to the class 3 seat for a full term until 2022.

Candidates

Democratic
 Wyche Fowler, U.S. Representative
 Hamilton Jordan, former  White House Chief of Staff
 John D. Russell, former State Representative from the 64th district (1981-1985)
 Jerry Belsky, LaRouche activist

Republican
 Mack Mattingly, incumbent U.S. Senator

Results

See also 
 1986 United States Senate elections

References 

Georgia
1986
1986 Georgia (U.S. state) elections